Bridgewater is a city in southwestern McCook County, South Dakota, United States. The population was 511 at the 2020 census.

History
Originally named Nation, the present name recalls an episode when water had to be carried to the town site for the railroad. A post office called Nation was established in 1880, and the name was changed that same year to Bridgewater.

Geography
Bridgewater is located at  (43.550192, -97.500319).

Bridgewater has been assigned the ZIP code 57319, and the FIPS place code 07180.

Demographics

2010 census
As of the census of 2010, there were 492 people, 204 households, and 133 families residing in the city. The racial makeup of the city was 98.4% White, 0.4% Native American, 0.6% Asian, 0.4% from other races, and 0.2% from two or more races. Hispanic or Latino of any race were 2.0% of the population.

There were 204 households, of which 28.9% had children under the age of 18 living with them, 48.5% were married couples living together, 11.8% had a female householder with no husband present, 4.9% had a male householder with no wife present, and 34.8% were non-families. 33.3% of all households were made up of individuals, and 21.1% had someone living alone who was 65 years of age or older. The average household size was 2.24 and the average family size was 2.77.

The median age in the city was 48.4 years. 23.8% of residents were under the age of 18; 2.6% were between the ages of 18 and 24; 19% were from 25 to 44; 25.6% were from 45 to 64; and 29.1% were 65 years of age or older. The gender makeup of the city was 45.3% male and 54.7% female.

2000 census
As of the census of 2000, there were 607 people, 245 households, and 147 families residing in the city. The population density was 541.4 people per square mile (209.3/km2). There were 266 housing units at an average density of 237.3 per square mile (91.7/km2). The racial makeup of the city was 98.35% White, 0.33% Native American, 0.33% Asian, 0.33% from other races, and 0.66% from two or more races. Hispanic or Latino of any race were 1.81% of the population.

There were 245 households, out of which 27.3% had children under the age of 18 living with them, 50.6% were married couples living together, 6.5% had a female householder with no husband present, and 39.6% were non-families. 35.5% of all households were made up of individuals, and 25.3% had someone living alone who was 65 years of age or older. The average household size was 2.31 and the average family size was 3.07.

In the city, the population was spread out, with 25.4% under the age of 18, 4.9% from 18 to 24, 21.7% from 25 to 44, 19.6% from 45 to 64, and 28.3% who were 65 years of age or older. The median age was 43 years. For every 100 females, there were 87.9 males. For every 100 females age 18 and over, there were 82.7 males.

The median income for a household in the city was $31,765, and the median income for a family was $39,375. Males had a median income of $28,611 versus $21,458 for females. The per capita income for the city was $15,855. About 5.5% of families and 9.5% of the population were below the poverty line, including 13.0% of those under age 18 and 10.4% of those age 65 or over.

Climate

Humid continental climate is a climatic region typified by large seasonal temperature differences, with warm to hot (and often humid) summers and cold (sometimes severely cold) winters. Precipitation is relatively well distributed year-round in many areas with this climate.  The Köppen Climate Classification subtype for this climate is "Dfa" (Hot Summer Continental Climate).

Notable people
 Donald M. Anderson, graphic designer and arts educator; born in Bridgewater
 Sparky Anderson, Hall of Fame baseball manager; born in Bridgewater. He is the namesake of Bridgewater's Sparky Anderson Park.

See also

 List of cities in South Dakota

References

External links

 

Cities in South Dakota
Cities in McCook County, South Dakota
Sioux Falls, South Dakota metropolitan area